Twice in a Lifetime may refer to:

 Twice in a Lifetime (TV series), a Canadian mystery/drama series
 Twice in a Lifetime (film), a 1985 film starring Gene Hackman
 Twice in a Lifetime (1974 film), a TV film starring Ernest Borgnine
 "Twice in a Lifetime", a song by Paul McCartney from The Paul McCartney Collection
 "Twice Inna Lifetime", a song by Black Star from Mos Def & Talib Kweli Are Black Star

See also 
 Once in a Lifetime (disambiguation)